Drayton Valley is a town in central Alberta, Canada. It is surrounded by Brazeau County, known for its vast oil fields. The town is located between the North Saskatchewan River and the Pembina River.

The town was named after Drayton, Hampshire, the birthplace of the wife of one of the Alberta town's postmasters.

History 

Prior to the 1953 oil boom, the community of Drayton Valley was sparsely populated.  The main economic activities were farming and logging. Drayton Valley was incorporated as a village in 1956 and officially became a town in 1957.  In 1955 a ferry was built to cross the North Saskatchewan River. The original bridge that replaced the ferry was eventually replaced by a new bridge in 2014.

Demographics 

In the 2016 Census of Population conducted by Statistics Canada, the Town of Drayton Valley recorded a population of 7,235 living in 2,782 of its 3,116 total private dwellings, a  change from its 2011 population of 7,118.

Economy 
Oil and gas is the primary driver of Drayton Valley's economy. Agriculture and forestry also play roles in the local economy. A sawmill is located in the town.

Attractions 

Drayton Valley's Omniplex is a community sports centre that hosts ice hockey, ringette, curling, soccer, baseball and rodeo. The town also has a public swimming pool, a ski hill, a bowling alley, and the Drayton Valley Golf and Country Club.

Sports 
Drayton Valley is the home of the Drayton Valley Thunder of the Alberta Junior Hockey League. Drayton Valley is also home to the annual DV100 bicycle race.

Education 
Drayton Valley has six public schools, two Catholic schools, and one outreach school. The public schools and outreach school are operated by the Wild Rose School Division while the Catholic schools are operated by the St. Thomas Aquinas Catholic School Division.

Wild Rose School Division
Aurora Elementary School
Drayton Christian School
Evergreen Elementary School
Frank Maddock High School
Frank Maddock Outreach School
H.W. Pickup Junior High School

St. Thomas Aquinas Catholic School Division
St. Anthony School
Holy Trinity Academy

Media 
Drayton Valley is served by two weekly newspapers, the Drayton Valley Western Review and the Drayton Valley and District Free Press and one radio station, CIBW-FM, mainly playing country music. A Christian radio station, CIDV-FM, was launched in 2009.

Notable people 
Diana Janet McQueen, Canadian politician, Progressive Conservative MLA (2008-2015)
Dave Hakstol, NHL Head Coach for the Seattle Kraken

See also 
List of communities in Alberta
List of towns in Alberta

References

External links 

1956 establishments in Alberta
Towns in Alberta
Former new towns in Alberta